The Renault R312 is a bus manufactured by Renault Trucks from 1987 to 1996. A prototype was completed in 1984. It succeeded the SC 10, which was originally a Saviem design from the 1960s. 

By placing the engine in the rear, the interior was flat over the vehicle's whole length. It was primarily built as an integral bus, although some were completed as rolling chassis.

The bus was popular in France, with over 4,000 produced, with RATP operating over 1,500 during the 1990s. In Australia, the Renault PR100.3 has the same visual appearance as the R312. Export sales were made to Germany, Italy and Switzerland.

References

External links

Buses of France
Renault buses
Step-entrance buses
Vehicles introduced in 1987